Víria Acte (fl. AD 90) was a Spanish entrepreneur and one of the few Spanish-Roman women known.  

She was married to Crescens and lived in Valencia, where she managed a successful company that manufactured statues and other stone monuments. Among the monuments she manufactured was the restoration of the damaged temple of Mars.

References
 «Diccionari Biogràfic de Dones: Víria Acte»
 Pereira Menaut, Gerardo (1997). Inscripciones romanas de Valencia. Valencia: Servicio de Investigación Prehistórica, Diputación Provincial de Valencia, p. 57–58.

1st-century Roman women
Ancient Roman merchants
Ancient businesswomen
Romans from Hispania
Ancient Roman businesspeople
Virii